Bridge of Muchalls is an entirely residential hamlet in Aberdeenshire, Scotland by the North Sea.  It is on the A90 dual carriageway about three miles north of Stonehaven and to the south of Muchalls Castle.

This small hamlet is known for its picturesque access to the rugged North Sea coastline at Muchalls Beach.  The Burn of Muchalls is a stream that flows east through the Bridge of Muchalls before passing under the A90 roadway and thence to the North Sea slightly to the north of Doonie Point. The ancient Causey Mounth trackway runs north from the now ruin Cowie Castle, past the Hill of Megray and passes over Kempstone Hill before crossing the Burn of Muchalls at the Bridge of Muchalls.

See also
Fetteresso Castle
Mill of Muchalls
Netherley
Red Moss

References

Villages in Aberdeenshire
Hamlets in Scotland